Triumph is a Canadian hard rock band that was popular in the late 1970s through the 1980s. Between the band's 16 albums and DVDs, Triumph has received 18 gold and 9 platinum awards in Canada and the United States. Triumph was nominated for multiple Juno Awards, including Group of the Year Award in 1979, 1985, 1986 and 1987.

The band was formed in 1975 by Gil Moore (Drums & Vocals), Rik Emmett (Guitar, Vocals), Mike Levine (Bass Guitar & Keyboards), the band had since experienced lineup changes, for example on the last Triumph album Rik Emmett left to pursue a solo career and was replaced by Phil X. The original members, Rik, Gil and Mike, are reunited today and have performed at the Sweden Rock Festival and Rocklahoma.

Studio albums

Live albums

Compilation albums

Videos

Singles

References

External links 
The Official Triumph Community Website

Discography
Discographies of Canadian artists
Heavy metal group discographies
Rock music group discographies